Rakesh Kumar Pal, known mononymously as Kumaar, is an Indian lyricist active in Bollywood cinema.  Some of his more successful songs include Rula ke gaya ishq, Tu bhi royega, Dil ki aadat, Baby Doll, Chittiyaan Kalaiyaan,  Sooraj Dooba hain, Lovely,  Desi Look, Nachan Farrate and Main Hoon Hero Tera.  He was nominated for Filmfare Awards for song Sooraj Dooba for film Roy.

 Films 

 Mere Dad Ki Maruti American Blend Shaabash! You Can Do It Bhram Rama Rama Kya Hai Dramaa? Dil Dosti Etc Toss The Stoneman Murders Sikandar Plan Life Partner Lottery Rangeelay Jawani Diwani: A Youthful Joyride Jashnn Hunterz 2 Humsey Hai Jahaan Hijack Musafir Chance Pe Dance Golmaal: Fun Unlimited All The Best: Fun Begins Raaz - The Mystery Continues Om Shanti Om Dostana Tum Mile I Hate Luv Storys Anjaana Anjaani Hello Darling Crook Golmaal 3 No Problem Toonpur Ka Super Hero Turning 30 Dil Toh Baccha Hai Ji Thank You Dharti Love Express Ready Murder 2 Phhir Sahi Dhandhe Galat Bande Yeh Dooriyan Speedy Singhs Yaar Annmulle Yaara O Dildaara Khushiyan Ra.One Desi Boyz Jo Hum Chahein Lanka Ghost Pure Punjabi Bittoo Boss 
 Blood Money Hate Story Yeh Jawaani Hai Deewani Hasee To Phasee Ragini MMS 2 Main Tera Hero Hate Story 2 Roy (film) Kapoor & Sons Bhoothnath Returns Ek Paheli Leela Ishqedarriyaan All Is Well Bhaag Johnny Hero Katti Batti Calendar Girls Singh Is Bliing Hate Story 3 Airlift Mastizaade Baaghi One Night Stand Do Lafzon Ki Kahani Junooniyat Beiimaan Love The Legend of Michael Mishra Hindi Medium Munna Michael Half Girlfriend Golmaal Again Fukrey Returns Sonu Ke Titu Ki Sweety Hate Story 4 Baaghi 2 Race 3 Mitron Dream Girl Khaali Peeli The Power The Girl on the Train Time to Dance Koi Jaane Na Hello CharlieGangubai KathiawadiRadhe ShyamBachchan Pandey Attack: Part 1 Jayeshbhai Jordaar Nikamma Jugjugg Jeeyo Rashtra Kavach Om Dhokha: Round D Corner Code Name: Tiranga Phone Bhoot Mister Mummy Govinda Naam Mera CirkusPathaan Shehzada''

Albums 
 "Kesariyo Rang" (ft. Shantanu Maheshwari)
 "Zaroori Hai Kya Ishq Mein"
" Teri baat aur hai, Meri baat aur hai"
 "Tere Naal Rehna (Zee Music Originals)"
 "Ishq Tera Tadpave"
 "Tere Naal Nachana"
 "Mere Piya"
 "Karunya"
 "V Super Singer"
 "Dilkare"
 "Lishki Lishki"
 "Dance Likhe Punjabi"
 "Tere Nal Nal"
 "Hunterz"
 "Master Ps"
 "Josh"
 "Chahat"
 "Dil Kare"
 "Honsala"
 "Yaad Teri" (Zee Music)
 "Royee Jande Naina" (Zee Music)
 "Gallan Goriyan" (single)
 "Madhanya"
 ″Thoda Thoda Pyaar Huaa Tumase″

Awards and nominations

References

External links

Indian lyricists
Living people
Year of birth missing (living people)